Michiyo Azusa (4 May 1943 - 29 January 2020) was the stage name of Michiyo Hayashi , a Japanese singer and actresses known for her 1963 song Konichiwa Akachan, or Hello Baby. Born in Fukuoka, Hayashi trained at the Takarazuka Music School, adopting her stage name when she started her singing career. As well as hits like Konichiwa Akachan, Futari De Osake Wo and Merankorī, she performed in a number of musical films, including Dorufutzzau desu yu! Zen'in Totsugeki of 1969, and continued to produce music into the 1990s, performing Konichiwa Akachan at the 1992 Kōhaku Uta Gassen. Her music spanned a wide range of styles from tango to J-pop.

Career
Michiyo Hayashi was born in Fukuoka on the island of Kyushu in Japan on 4 May 1943. She went to Takarazuka Music School and from there joined Watanabe Productions, adopting the stage name Michiyo Azusa. In 1963, Azusa released Konnichiwa Akachan,, also known in English as Hello Baby. With lyrics by Rokusuke Ei and music composed by Hachidai Nakamura, It won the 6th Japan Record Awards in 1964. She continued to release music for the next thirty years, using a wide range of genres, including tango and J-pop. Having had a hiatus lasting ten years, there was surprise in the music press when her 1974 song Futari De Osake Wo  in English Let's Drink Sake Together, won a Popular Music Award at the 16th Japan Record Awards. Two years later, her song Merankorī , composed by Takuro Yoshida, won Best Arrangement at the 18th Japan Record Awards.

In addition to singing, Azusa also acted, appearing in musical films and on television. For example, she starred in Shūe Matsubayashi's 1964 film A Little Matchmaker, which appeared in Japan under the same name as Azusa's famous hit, Konnichiwa Akachan. In 1983, she appeared in the Japanese television drama Natsu ni Koisuru Onnatachi. She was a frequent guest on Kōhaku Uta Gassen, appearing for the eleventh time in 1992, at which she sang Konnichiwa Akachan in honour of the composer, who had died that year.

Family life
Asuza married the actor Kōji Wada in April 1972. However, their marriage did not last, due to Wada's infidelity, financial difficulties and strained relationships between Asuza and Wada's family. They announced their divorce after one year and seven months on 4 October 1973. Azuza remained unmarried. She died of a heart attack aged 78 on 29 January 2020 at home in Tokyo and was posthumously awarded the Lifetime Achievement Award at the 62nd Japan Record Awards.

Discography

Singles
Singles released under Azusa's name included:
 1962 Bossa Noba de kissu / Yukidori Koi .
 1976 Merankorī / yukidoke .

Studio Albums
Azusa Michiyo performed in many albums including:
 1963 Azusa Michiyo Dai-Isshuu .
 1964 Konnichiwa Akachan/Azusa Michiyo Dai-Nishuu .
 1964 My Couple (Azusa Michiyo)|My Couple .
 1964 Oka-san/Michyo no Hit Parade Vol.3 
 1964 Futari wa Steady/My Couple Vol.2 
 1965 Michiyo to Utaou/Azusa Michiyo no Jojo kashuu .
 1970 Taishoku Negai ―Natsuko no Kekkon― .
 1974 Futari De Osake Wo .
 1976 Merankorī .
 1979 Onna ga otoko wo kataru toki .

Greatest Hits Albums
Azusa has appeared in a number of compilation albums including:
 1976 Melancholy "Golden Star Album" .

Live Albums
Live performances that were produced as albums included:
 1972 Azusa Michiyo On Stage 
 1975 Azusa Michiyo Recital

Filmography
Azusa starred in musical films including:
 1964  A Little Matchmaker or Konnichiwa Akachan .
 1969 Let's Go Drifters or Dorufutzzau desu yu! Zen'in Totsugeki .

Awarded Songs

References

Citations

Bibliography

 
 
 
 
 
 

1943 births
2020 deaths
Actors from Fukuoka Prefecture
Musicians from Fukuoka Prefecture
People from Fukuoka